Escuela Superior de Economía y Negocios (ESEN) (English: Higher School of Economics and Business) is a private, non-profit university in La Libertad, El Salvador. It was founded in 1994. In 1997, ESEN opened an Entrepreneur Center, a unit whose mission is to promote and develop entrepreneurship among employers to create jobs.

Academic authorities
 Ricardo Poma - Rector
 Everardo Rivera -  General Director
 Carmen Aida Lazo - Dean of Economics and Business
 Albino Tinetti - Dean of Law
 Sven Mauricio Guzman - Dean of Business Engineering

Student organizations
Un Techo Para Mi País
Sociedad de Alumnos Emprendedores (SAE)
Model United Nations (MUN)
Rotaract
Pasitos
ESENarte
AIESEC
HOPE

External links
 Official website

Business schools
Educational institutions established in 1993
1993 establishments in El Salvador
Universities in El Salvador